James Wade (born 1983) is an English darts player

James, Jamie, Jim or Jimmy Wade may also refer to:
 James Wade (basketball) (born 1975), American-French basketball coach
 James F. Wade (1843–1921), Spanish-American War general
 James P. Wade (born 1930), author, with Harlan K. Ullman, of the doctrine of strategic dominance, more popularly known as shock and awe
 James St Clair Wade, British architect
 Jamie Wade (born 1981), English cricketer
 Jim Wade (1925–2019), American football player
 Jimmy Wade (c.1895–1957), American jazz trumpeter and bandleader